Dhiraj Prasad Sahu (born 23 November 1959) is the politician from Indian National Congress Party. He was elected to Rajya Sabha from state of Jharkhand of the ticket of INC in July 2010.

Early life
He is son of social worker Baldeo Sahu and Shushila Devi. He is brother of former member of parliament Shiv Prasad Sahu.
He has studied B. A. and resides at Lohardaga.

Career
He belongs to an industrial family which has been associated with Congress Party since Independence. He joined politics in 1977. He was jailed during "Jail Bharo Andolan" in 1978. In June 2009 elected to Rajya Sabha and again reelected to Rajya Sabha in July 2010.

References

1959 births
Living people
Indian National Congress politicians from Jharkhand
People from Ranchi district
People from Lohardaga district
Rajya Sabha members from Jharkhand
Nagpuria people